Alakola-anga is a village in Sri Lanka. It is located near Matale, within Matale District, Central Province.

History
The inhabitants were "Vellalas, Blacksmiths, Welli Durayo, [and] Hangarammu, who do iron work", according to Archibald Campbell Lawrie's 1896 gazetteer of the province, referring to different castes.

Demographics

See also
List of towns in Central Province, Sri Lanka

External links

References

Populated places in Matale District